Scarritt College (founded in 1878 at Neosho, Missouri) began as the Neosho Male and Female Seminary. In 1887 it was reconstituted as the Scarritt Collegiate Institute.

History
Opening its doors on September 2, 1878, the school's first home was inside the Methodist Episcopal Church, South, in Neosho. D. M. Conway was its first president. Outgrowing the church, in October 1878 the school purchased a local house and moved into it. In 1880, under the leadership of G. H. Williamson, the seminary was incorporated, taking the name Neosho Collegiate Institute.  Led by W. C. Montgomery, and having again outgrown its new home, the school built a new facility at the same location.

In the spring of 1887, after several years of financial difficulties, the Neosho Collegiate Institute was forced to close.  After a donation by Dr. Nathan Spencer Scarritt of Kansas City, the school reopened the following spring under the name Scarritt Collegiate Institute, in honor of its benefactor.

After several years of success and growth, starting in 1900 several setbacks led to a steady decline in enrollment. In 1902, John Brown took the helm, becoming the youngest college president in the nation.  He would go on to found Southwestern Collegiate Institute, later John Brown University in Siloam Springs, Arkansas.  Again in 1903, due to mounting debt, Scarritt closed its doors.

The school operated as Scarritt College, a business school, for a short time before the doors in Neosho were closed permanently in 1907. In 1908 it merged with another college and moved to Morrisville, in 1909 merged with Ebenezer College from Ebenezer, Missouri and later became Scarritt-Morrisville College which again merged with Central College to become known as Central Methodist College, Fayette, Missouri.

Notes of interest
The Neosho School District purchased the property, and in 1916 the empty buildings were razed to make way for a new public high school for the city of Neosho.

Scarritt Collegiate Institute was attended by cowboy philosopher and humorist Will Rogers for a single semester in the late 1890s before his transfer to Kemper Military School in Boonville, Missouri.

Notable alumni
 E. LeBron Fairbanks, college and seminary president
 Sue Thrasher, activist, writer and educator
Educational institutions established in 1878
Defunct private universities and colleges in Missouri
Buildings and structures in Newton County, Missouri
1878 establishments in Missouri